Institut Universitari de Cultura, also known by the acronym IUC, is a school belonging to Pompeu Fabra University, in Barcelona. It was created in 1994 in order to promote interdisciplinary cultural research in the fields of art, philosophy and literature. It's directed by Rafael Argullol. IUC includes the university's Seminar of Slavic Studies, the Seminar of History of Religions, and the Prehistoric Art Research Centre, as well as a number of Humanities postgraduate and doctorate programs. It's closely associated with the Biblioteca Mystica et Philosophica Alois M. Haas, hosted in the Ciutadella Campus of UPF.

External links
Institut Universitari de Cultura website at UPF.edu
Bibliotheca Mystica et Philosophica Alois M. Haas at UPF.edu
Haas Special Collection at UPF Barcelona Library

Pompeu Fabra University
Culture in Barcelona